Kjetil Nordhus (born 31 May 1975 in Kristiansand, Vest Agder) is a Norwegian singer, composer and music producer who is currently the vocalist in Green Carnation and Nightshadows Lament.

Music
Nordhus has been a singer and composer in a number of bands, including the progressive metal band Green Carnation, goth metal band Trail of Tears, melodic death metal band Chain Collector, and progressive metal / middle eastern folk band Subterranean Masquerade.

Discography

References

External links
 Official website of Tristania

1975 births
Norwegian heavy metal singers
Living people
People from Vennesla
21st-century Norwegian singers
21st-century Norwegian male singers